, also pronounced "tō-in", are Japanese kanji readings imported from China by Zen monks and merchants during and after the Song dynasty. This period roughly corresponds with the mid-Heian to Edo periods of Japan.

Scholars divide tō-on into two groups: those that are based on Zen of the Middle Ages, and those based on the Ōbaku school of Buddhism of the Middle Ages.  The latter are the readings sometimes referred to as "sō-on".

Tō-on readings are not systematic, as they were introduced piecemeal from China, often along with very specialized terminology.

The Ōbaku Zen school of Buddhism uses Tō-on exclusively for liturgy.

See also 
 Go-on
 Kan-on

Zen
Buddhism in the Kamakura period
Buddhism in the Muromachi period
Buddhism in the Edo period
Kanji